Heligmothrips is a genus of thrips in the family Phlaeothripidae.

Species
 Heligmothrips brevidens
 Heligmothrips eiletus
 Heligmothrips erinaceus
 Heligmothrips frickeri
 Heligmothrips gracilior
 Heligmothrips reticulaticeps

References

Phlaeothripidae
Thrips
Thrips genera